Konti may refer to:

 Konti Group, a Ukrainian confectionery manufacturer company based in Donetsk
 Isidore Konti, a Vienna-born (of Hungarian parents) sculptor

See also
 Conti